Furia infernal, known in English-speaking territories as Ardent Summer, The Hot Days or, in the Carne Sobre Carne: Intimidades de Isabel Sarli documentary rendering, The Horny Days, is a 1973 Argentine drama film directed by Armando Bó and starring Isabel Sarli.

Cast
 Isabel Sarli as Barbara Serrano
 Jorge Barreiro as Martin's Son
 Hugo Mújica as Martin's Son
 Víctor Bó as Juan / Martin's Younger Son
 Roberto Landers as Ruiz / Henchman
 Pancho Jiménez as Berto / Henchman
 Juan José Miguez as Martin Sottomayor / Land Owner
 Mario Casado as Indian Peon
 R. Casatti as Judge

References

External links
 

1973 films
Argentine drama films
1970s Spanish-language films
Films directed by Armando Bó
1970s Argentine films
1973 drama films